Frank Xavier Leyendecker (January 19, 1876 – April 18, 1924), also known as Frank James Leyendecker, was a German-American commercial artist and illustrator. He worked with his brother Joseph Christian Leyendecker, in their studio, first in Chicago,  then later in New York City and New Rochelle, New York.

Biography
Franz Xavier Leyendecker was born in Montabour, Germany on January 19, 1876. In 1884 he immigrated with his parents and three siblings to Chicago where an uncle owned the McAvoy Brewery. From 1895-1897 he studied at the Académie Julian in Paris, France. 

He was known for his stained glass work as well as his illustrations for posters, books, magazines and advertisements. He provided artwork for ads for Kum-a-Part jewelry, E. Howard Watch Company, Franklin automobiles, Kuppenheimer clothes, Right Posture clothes, Ohio Electric automobiles, Remington Arms/Union Metallic Carbide, Durham hosiery, and BVD underwear. He painted covers for a large number of mass-readership magazines including Street & Smith pulp magazines, such as People's Favorite Magazine and The Popular Magazine, as well as for Fawcett's pulp magazine Battle Stories. His artwork for Battle Stories was initially produced as a WWI recruitment poster and reprinted as a pulp magazine cover by Fawcett Publications in 1931. His work was described as an "important feature" of the second exhibition of the Society of Illustrators at the International gallery in New York.

Leyendecker served as the judge in the first Strathmore Water Color Contest, sponsored by the Mittineague Paper Company of Massachusetts. 

Frank Leyendecker and his sister Augusta Mary Leyendecker and the model Charles A. Beach lived for a time in a large house built and co-owned by the two brothers in New Rochelle, New York.

Leyendecker was suffering from depression and poor health due to his ongoing drug addiction, when he died, most likely by suicide, of a morphine overdose on April 18, 1924, at the age of 48.

References

External links 

 
F. X. Leyendecker (Frank Xavier) artwork can be viewed at American Art Archives web site
 

1876 births
1924 suicides
American illustrators
German emigrants to the United States
Drug-related suicides in New York (state)
Artists from New Rochelle, New York
Culture of New Rochelle, New York
Artists who committed suicide
1924 deaths